Al-Muftakhira was a Palestinian Arab village in the Safad Subdistrict. It was depopulated in the 1948 War on May 16, 1948, by the Palmach's First Battalion during Operation Yiftach. It was located 25.5 km northeast of Safad.

In  the 1945 statistics it had a population of 350.

References

Bibliography

External links
 Welcome To al-Muftakhira
 al-Muftakhira, Villages of Palestine
al-Muftakhira, Zochrot

Arab villages depopulated during the 1948 Arab–Israeli War
District of Safad